Domingo Martínez may refer to:

 Domingo Martínez (baseball) (born 1965), former baseball player
 Domingo Martínez (footballer) (born 1982), Paraguayan footballer
 Domingo Martinez (author), Mexican-American author known for his memoirs (2012)
 Domingo Martínez de Irala  (c. 1509–c. 1556), Spanish Basque conquistador
 Domingo Martinez (politician), American politician and New Mexico State Auditor